Gagnåsvatnet or Gangåsvatnet is a lake in the municipality of Orkland in Trøndelag county, Norway.

The water flows into the lake from the Songa river which flows out of the lake Våvatnet which is also in Orkland. The water leaves the lake through the Skjenaldelva river which ultimately flows into the Trondheimsfjord.

See also
List of lakes in Norway

References

Lakes of Trøndelag
Orkland